Giosafat Barbaro (also Giosaphat or Josaphat) (1413–1494) was a member of the Venetian Barbaro family. He was a diplomat, merchant, explorer and travel writer. He was unusually well-travelled for someone of his times.

Family
Giosafat Barbaro was born to Antonio and Franceschina Barbaro in a palazzo on the Campo di Santa Maria Formosa. He became a member of the Venetian Senate in 1431. In 1434, he married Nona Duodo, daughter of Arsenio Duodo. Giosafat and Nona had three daughters and a son, Giovanni Antonio.

Travels to Tana

From 1436 to 1452 Barbaro traveled as a merchant to Tana on the Sea of Azov. During this time the Golden Horde was disintegrating due to political rivalries.

In November 1437, Barbaro heard of the burial mound of the last King of the Alans, about 20 miles up the Don River from Tana.
 Barbaro and six other men, a mix of Venetian and Jewish merchants, hired 120 men to excavate the kurgan, which they hoped would contain treasure. When the weather proved too severe, they returned in March 1438, but found no treasure. Barbaro analytically and precisely recorded information about the layers of earth, coal, ashes, millet, and fish scales that composed the mound. Modern scholarship concludes that it was not a burial mound, but a kitchen midden that had accumulated over centuries of use. The remains of Barbaro's excavation was found in the 1920s by Russian archeologist Alexander Alexandrovich Miller.

In 1438, the Great Horde under Küchük Muhammad advanced on Tana. Barbaro went as an emissary to the Tatars to persuade them not to attack Tana. Later, Barbaro was part of a group that drove off a hundred Circassian raiders. Barbaro visited many cities in the Crimea, including Solcati, Soldaia, Cembalo, and Caffa. Barbaro also traveled to Russia where he visited Kazan (Casan) and Novogorod, "which had already come under the power of the Muscovites" (che gia era venuta in potere de'Moscoviti).

Giosafat Barbaro did not spend all of the years from 1436 to 1452 in Tartary In 1446, he was elected to the Council of Forty. In 1448, he was appointed Provveditore of the trading colonies Modon and Corone in the Peloponnese and served until his resignation the following year. Since there was regular trade between Venice and Tana at this time, it seems likely Barbaro went to Tana to trade and returned to Venice for the winter over this time. Barbaro stopped these travels when the Crimean Khanate became a client state of the Ottoman Turks. Barbaro returned to Venice in 1452, traveling by way of Russia, Poland, and Germany. In 1455, Barbaro freed a pair of Tartar men he had found in Venice, housed them for two months, and sent them home to Tana.

Political career
In 1460, Giosafat Barbaro was elected Council to Tana, but he declined the position. In 1463, he was appointed Provveditore of Albania. While there, Barbaro he fought with Lekë Dukagjini and Skanderbeg against the Turks. Provveditore Barbaro linked his forces with those of Dukagjini and Nicolo Moneta to form an auxiliary corps of 13,000 men which was sent to relieve the Second Siege of Krujë. After Skanderbeg's death, Barbaro returned to Venice again.

In 1469, Giosafat Barbaro was made Provveditore of Scutari, in Albania. He was in command of 1200 cavalry, which he used to support Lekë Dukagjini. In 1472, Barbaro was back in Venice, where he was one of the 41 senators chosen to act as electors, who selected Nicolo Tron as Doge.

Venetian conflict with the Ottoman Turks
In 1463, the Venetian Senate, seeking allies against the Turks, had sent Lazzaro Querini as its first ambassador to Persia, but he was unable to persuade Persia to attack the Turks. The ruler of Persia, Uzun Hassan, sent his own envoys to Venice in return. After Negroponte fell to the Turks, Venice, Naples, the Papal States, the Kingdom of Cyprus and the Knights of Rhodes signed an agreement to ally against the Turks.

In 1471, ambassador Querini returned to Venice with Uzun Hassan's ambassador Murad. The Venetian Senate voted to send another ambassador to Persia, choosing Caterino Zeno after two other men declined. Zeno, whose wife was the niece of Uzun Hassan's wife, was able to persuade Hassan to attack the Turks. Hassan was successful at first, but there were no simultaneous attacks by any of the western powers and the war turned against Persia.

Ambassador to Persia
In 1472, Giosafat Barbaro was also selected as an ambassador to Persia, due to his experience in the Crimean, Muscovy, and Tartary. He also spoke Turkish and a little Persian. Barbaro was provided with an escort of ten men and an annual salary of 1800 ducats. His instructions included urging admiral Pietro Mocenigo to attack the Ottomans and attempting to arrange naval cooperation from the Kingdom of Cyprus and the Knights of Rhodes. He was also in charge of three galleys full of artillery, ammunition, and military personnel who were to assist Uzun Hassan.

In February 1473, Barbaro and the Persian envoy Haci Muhammad left Venice and traveled to Zadar, where they met with representatives of Naples and the Papal court. From there, Barbaro and the others traveled by way of Corfu, Modon, Corone reaching Rhodes and then Cyprus, where Barbaro was delayed for a year.

 The Kingdom of Cyprus's position off the coast of Anatolia was in a key position for supplying, not just Uzun Hassan in Persia, but the Venetian allies of Caramania and Scandelore (present day Alanya) and the Venetian fleet under Pietro Mocenigo was used to defend communication lines to them. King James II of Cyprus had attempted to ally with Caramania and Scandelore, as well as the Sultan of Egypt, against the Turks. King James had also written to the Venetian Senate, stressing the need to support Persia against the Turks and his navy had cooperated with Admiral Mocenigo in recapturing the coastal towns of Gorhigos and Selefke.

The Emir of Scandelore fell to the Turks in 1473 in spite of military aid from the Kingdom of Cyprus. The power of Caramania was broken. James II of Cyprus privately told Giosafat Barbaro he felt like he was trapped between two wolves, the Ottoman Sultan and the Egyptian Sultan. The latter was James' liege lord, and not on friendly terms with Venice.

James II entered into negotiations with the Turks. At first he refused to let the Venetian galleys with their munitions land in the port of Famagusta. When Barbaro and the Venetian ambassador, Nicolo Pasqualigo, attempted to persuade James II to change his mind, the King threatened to destroy the galleys and kill every man on board.

King James II of Cyprus died in July 1473, leaving Queen Catherine a pregnant widow. James had appointed a seven-member council, which contained Venetian Andrea Cornaro, a relative of the Queen, as well as Marin Rizzo and Giovanni Fabrice, agents of the Kingdom of Naples who opposed Venetian influence. Queen Catherine gave birth to a son, James II in August 1473., with Admiral Pietro Mocenigo and other Venetian officials acting as godfathers.

Once the Venetian fleet left, there was a revolt by pro-Neapolitan forces, which resulted in the deaths of the Queen's uncle and cousin. The Archbishop of Nicosia, Juan Tafures, the Count of Tripoli, the Count of Jaffa, and Marin Rizzo seized Famagusta, capturing the Queen and the newborn King.

Barbaro and Bailo Pasqualigo were protected by the Venetian soldiers that had accompanied Barbaro. The conspirators made several attempts to persuade Barbaro to hand over the soldiers' arms. The Constable of Cyprus sent an agent, while the Count of Tripoli, the Archbishop of Nicosia, and the Constable of Jerusalem made personal visits. After consulting with Bailo Pasqualigo, they decided to disarm the men, but keep the weapons. Barbaro alerted the captains of the Venetian galleys in the harbor. Barbaro also sent dispatches the Senate of Venice, warning them of events. Later, Barbaro and the Venetian troops withdrew to one of the galleys.

By the time Admiral Mocenigo returned to Cyprus, the rebels were quarreling among themselves and the people of Nicosia and Famagusta had risen against them. The uprising was suppressed, those ringleaders who did not flee were executed, and Cyprus became a Venetian client state. The Venetian Senate authorized the troops and military that had accompanied Giosafat Barbaro to stay in Cyprus.

Giosafat Barbaro was still in Cyprus in December 1473, and the Venetian Senate sent a letter, telling Barbaro to complete his journey, as well as sending another ambassador, Ambrogio Contarini to Persia. Barbaro and the Persian envoy left Cyprus in February 1474 disguised as Muslim pilgrims. The Papal and Neapolitan envoys did not accompany them. Barbaro landed in Caramania, where the King warned them that the Turks held the territory they would need to travel through. After landing in Cilicia, Barbaro's party traveled through Tarsus, Adana, Orfa, Merdin, Hasankeyf, and Tigranocerta

 In the Taurus Mountains of Kurdistan, Barbaro's party was attacked by bandits. He escaped on horseback, but he was wounded and several members of the group, including his secretary and the Persian ambassador were killed, and their goods were plundered. As they neared Tabriz, Barbaro and his interpreter were assaulted by Turcomans after refusing to hand over a letter to Uzun Hassan Barbaro and his surviving companions finally reached Hassan's court in April 1474.

Although Barbaro got on well with Uzun Hassan, he was unable to persuade the ruler to attack the Ottomans again. Shortly afterwards, Hassan's son Ogurlu Mohamed, rose in rebellion, seizing the city of Schiras.

 Barbaro visited the ruins of Persepolis, which he incorrectly thought were of Jewish origin. He also visited Tauris, Soldania, Isph, Cassan (Kascian), Como (Kom), Yezd, Shiraz and Baghdad. Giosafat Barbaro was the first European to visit the ruins of Pasargadae, where he believed the local tradition that misidentified the tomb of Cyrus the Great as belonging to King Solomon’s mother. 

The other Venetian ambassador, Ambrosio Contarini, arrived in Persia in August 1474. Uzun Hassan decided that Contarini would return to Venice with a report, while Giosafat Barbaro would stay in Persia.

Return to Venice
Barbaro was the last Venetian ambassador to leave Persia, after Uzun Hassan died in 1478. By this point only one of Barbaro's entourage was left. While Hassan's sons fought each other for the throne, Barbaro hired an Armenian guide and escaped by way of Erzerum, Aleppo, and Beirut. Barbaro reached Venice in 1479, where he defended himself against complaints that he had spent too much time in Cyprus before going to Persia. Barbaro's report included not just political and military matters, but discussed Persian agriculture, commerce, and customs.

Giosafat Barbaro served as Captain of Rovigo and Provveditore of all Polesine from 1482 to 1485. He was also one of the Councilors of Doge Agostino Barbarigo He died in 1494 and was buried in the Church of San Francesco della Vigna.

Writing
In 1487, Barbaro wrote an account of his travels. In it, he mentions being familiar with the accounts of Niccolò de' Conti and John de Mandeville.

Barbaro's account of his travels, entitled " Viaggi fatti da Vinetia, alla Tana, in Persia" was first published from 1543 to 1545 by the sons of Aldus Manutius. It is included Giovanne Baptista Ramusio's 1559 "Collection of Travels" as "Journey to the Tanais, Persia, India, and Constantinople" The scholar and courtier William Thomas translated this work into English for the young King Edward VI under the title ‘’Travels to Tana and Persia’’ and also includes the account of Barbaro’s fellow ambassador to Persia, Ambrogio Contarini. This work was republished in London in 1873 by the Hakluyt Society. and a Russian language edition was published in 1971. In 1583, Barbaro’s account was published by Filippo Giunti in ‘’Volume Delle Navigationi Et Viaggi’’ along with those of Marco Polo and Kirakos Gandzaketsi’s account of the travels of Hethum I, King of Armenia. In 1601, Barbaro’s and Contarini’s accounts were included in Pietro Bizzarri’s ‘’ Rerum Persicarum Historia’’ along with accounts by Bonacursius, Jacob Geuder von Heroldsberg, Giovanni Tommaso Minadoi, and Henricus Porsius; which was published in Frankfurt. in 2005, Barbaro’s account was also published in Turkish as ‘’ Anadolu'ya ve İran'a seyahat’’.

Barbaro's account provided more information on Persia and its resources than that of Contarini. He showed skill in observing unfamiliar places and reporting on them. Much of Barbaro's information about the Kipchak Khanate, Persia, and Georgia is not found in any other sources.

Giosafat Barbaro's dispatches to the Venetian Senate were compiled by Enrico Cornet and published as Lettere al Senato Veneto in 1852 in Vienna. Barbaro also discussed his travels in a letter written in 1491 to the Bishop of Padua, Pietro Barocci.

In popular culture
He is one of the historical characters who appear in Dorothy Dunnett's novel Caprice and Rondo in the House of Niccolò series.
In the game Civilization V he is a great merchant for the Venetians.

Notes

References

External links
 Travels of Josaphat Barbaro Ambassador from Venice to Tanna in 1436

1413 births
1494 deaths
Explorers from the Republic of Venice
Republic of Venice merchants
Republic of Venice military personnel
Italian travel writers
15th-century travel writers
Italian male writers
Republic of Venice nobility
Giosafat
Republic of Venice politicians
Republic of Venice diplomats
Medieval Italian diplomats
Medieval travel writers
Governors-general
15th-century Italian judges
15th-century diplomats
15th-century Italian businesspeople